North Korea is competing at the 2013 World Aquatics Championships in Barcelona, Spain between 19 July and 4 August 2013.

Diving

North Korea qualified five quota places for the following diving events.

Men

Women

Synchronized swimming

North Korea has qualified ten synchronized swimmers.

References

External links
Barcelona 2013 Official Site

Nations at the 2013 World Aquatics Championships
2013 in North Korean sport
North Korea at the World Aquatics Championships